Fitzgeralds may refer to:
 Fitzgeralds Black Hawk in Black Hawk, Colorado
 Fitzgeralds Las Vegas, now The D Las Vegas in Las Vegas, Nevada
 Fitzgeralds Reno, now Whitney Peak Hotel, a non gaming hotel in Reno, Nevada
 Fitzgeralds Tunica in Tunica, Mississippi

See also 
 FitzGerald (disambiguation)